Really is a British free-to-air digital television channel broadcasting in the United Kingdom and Ireland, currently owned by Warner Bros. Discovery. The channel launched on 19 May 2009 as UKTV's channel for female audiences. The channel shows a mixture of lifestyle, medical, real life, crime and paranormal programming. It is available on satellite through Sky and Freesat, cable through Virgin Media and also on digital terrestrial provider Freeview.

History
The channel was launched on 19 May 2009 at 9am as part of the major rebranding and repositioning of the UKTV network. The new channel was created to provide fashion, medical, real life, and crime programming on the UKTV network, by airing programming previously aired on UKTV Style. As part of the repositioning of UKTV Style to Home, this channel would focus primarily on home and garden programming. As part of this, UKTV Gardens was closed, with programmes merged with Home. The new channel Really would launch from UKTV Gardens' broadcast slot and would replace the channel on that service. Responsible for launching Really would be the channel head: Clare Laycock since July 2008. The channel was originally available only on satellite and cable services, however on 14 June 2011, UKTV announced that Really would launch on Freeview channel 20 on 2 August 2011. The channel, along with
Drama, were added to Virgin Media in Ireland on September 2018.

On 1 April 2019, it was announced that UKTV co-owner Discovery Inc. would acquire the BBC's stake in Really.

Identity

Really's identity originally centred on a pop art style cartoon of women in various situations which as the ident goes on resolves itself into an unusual outcome. At this outcome, the characters are shown with speech bubbles containing the Really logo, which then forms into the centre of the screen. Really used a generic promotion layout, consisting of the logo starting off the promotion before being located in the bottom right corner of the screen throughout before forming in the centre of the screen, alongside one of the ident characters, at the end.

Really received a new look on 15 May 2013, created by Red Bee Media, along with a new slogan 'Really gets you'.

On 31 March 2016, Really received new idents. This time, the screen is split into two at a 45-degree angle, and that 2 objects come together to form one, these idents are similar to the launch of the UKTV network in 1997. For example, a rose and a hypodermic needle, a camera and a bank safe and X-ray and ink.

On May 29, 2017, Really received another new identity.

In January 2021, Really introduced a new set of idents whilst retaining the old logo.

Programming
The majority of Really's programmes came from the programme archives of the BBC, through their once part ownership of UKTV. Due to a similar remit between the two channels, Really re-broadcasts many programmes previously shown on the channel BBC Three , and a few from BBC One, ITV, Channel 4 and Channel 5. The channel also has UK exclusive airings of the US shows Hart of Dixie and Covert Affairs.

Since the channel began airing in 2009, Medicals Real Life and Crimes on 7 September 2009 Most Haunted Live! 2015 remains the most watched programme in the channel's history. The episode featured a paranormal investigation at '30 East Drive'.

Really's current schedule of programmes include:

10 Years Younger
A Life of Grime
A Place in the Sun
Addicted to Beauty
Antiques Road Trip
Being Human – (Series 1)
Bizarre ER
Boston Med
Bridezillas
Britain's Missing Top Model
Celebrity MasterChef
Cheaters
Covert Affairs
The Clothes Show
Destination Fear (2019 TV series)
Divorce Court
Don't Tell the Bride
Doctor Who
The Ellen DeGeneres Show – (Series 9 and 10)
Escape to the Country
Extreme Makeover
Extreme Makeover: Home Edition
Final Witness
Four in a Bed
Freaky Eaters
Gavin & Stacey
Ghost Adventures
Ghost Hunters
Ghost Nation
Grey's Anatomy – (Series 1, 2 and 3)
Hart of Dixie – (Series 1 and 2)
Haunted Collector
Haunting: Australia
Helicopter Heroes
Hitched or Ditched
How to Look Good Naked
I Survived Evil
Kill It, Cook It, Eat It
Mary Queen of Shops
MasterChef Australia
MasterChef New Zealand
MasterChef South Africa
Missing Persons Unit
Most Haunted
Most Haunted Live!
That Mitchell and Webb Look
The Mighty Boosh
The O.C.
One Born Every Minute
Paranormal Lockdown
Paranormal Lockdown UK
Paranormal Witness
The Rachel Zoe Project
The Sex Inspectors
Snog Marry Avoid?
Smart Guy
Undercover Boss
What Not to Wear

Medical programming
City Hospital
Doctors at Large
Doctors to Be
Medical Emergency 
Medics of the Glen
Trauma
Your Life in their Hands

Real life programming
999
999 Lifesavers
Accident and Emergency
Ambulance 
Blues and Twos
Chopper Coppers
Cops
Global Cops
Lifeboat Rescue 
Raw Blues
Rescue Heroes

Crime programming
Autopsy
Blues and Twos
Catching the Killers
Chopper Coppers
Cops
Crimes and Firelines
Crime Pursuits 
Crime Squad
Forensic Fles
Global Cops
Inside the Criminal Mind
Killer Cult
Mind of the MurderersRaw Blues Scenes of CrimeSerial Killers Traffic Cops''

See also
 UKTV
 Television in the United Kingdom

References

External links

2009 establishments in the United Kingdom
Television channels in the United Kingdom
Television channels and stations established in 2009
Warner Bros. Discovery networks
UKTV
UKTV channels